This is a list of members of the 42nd Legislative Assembly of Queensland from 1977 to 1980, as elected at the 1977 state election held 12 November 1977.

 On 13 September 1978, the Liberal member for Sherwood, John Herbert, resigned due to ill health (he died on 30 October). Liberal candidate Angus Innes won the resulting by-election on 25 November 1978.
 On 7 August 1979, the National member for Redcliffe, Jim Houghton, resigned. Liberal candidate Terry White won the resulting by-election on 1 September 1979.
 On 8 August 1979, the National member for Gympie, Max Hodges, resigned. National candidate Len Stephan won the resulting by-election on 1 September 1979.

See also
1977 Queensland state election
Premier: Joh Bjelke-Petersen (National Party) (1968–1987)

References

Members of Queensland parliaments by term
20th-century Australian politicians